Jose "Joe" Lipa, Jr. is a Filipino basketball coach and executive who currently coaching the Terrafirma Dyip's 3x3 team in the PBA 3x3. 

Lipa formerly coached his alma mater, the University of the Philippines, in the University Athletic Association of the Philippines men's basketball.  He also had a head coaching stint for the Manila Beer Brewmasters, Ateneo Blue Eagles, the Shell Turbo Chargers and the FedEx Express of the professional Philippine Basketball Association. Lipa is also a former head coach of the national basketball team of the Philippines, coaching the team to a bronze medal finish in the 1986 Asian Games. He was also named the Commissioner of the UAAP for its basketball tournament in 2005. He currently serves as the tournament director and commissioner of the Philippine Collegiate Champions League and the Filoil EcoOil Preseason Cup.

Profile
An Economics graduate at the State University, Joe Lipa played with the Maroons in 1963–66. He also donned the San Miguel jersey in the MICAA in 1965–66, where he played as a power forward. Starting in 1981, he was assigned to handle the UP Maroons after serving as assistant coach way back in 1978, Lipa was sent on a basketball scholarship to the United States in 1984, where he observed the coaching prowess of famed mentor Bobby Knight of Indiana University during sessions at the University of Southern California. He made the trip through the help of the UP Sports Foundation, courtesy of the UP President, and his Sigma Rho fraternity brothers. In 1986, Joe led his alumni, the UP Maroons to its first UAAP championship after 47 years.

Coaching record

Collegiate record

Philippine Basketball Association record

References 

Living people
Filipino men's basketball coaches
Filipino men's basketball players
Shell Turbo Chargers coaches
UP Fighting Maroons basketball players
Philippines men's national basketball team coaches
1943 births
UP Fighting Maroons basketball coaches
Manila Beer Brewmasters coaches
Ateneo Blue Eagles men's basketball coaches
Barako Bull Energy Boosters coaches